Alphonse Mandonda (born 5 December 1950) is a Congolese middle-distance runner. He competed in the men's 800 metres at the 1972 Summer Olympics.

References

1950 births
Living people
Athletes (track and field) at the 1972 Summer Olympics
Republic of the Congo male middle-distance runners
Olympic athletes of the Republic of the Congo
Competitors at the 1973 Summer Universiade
Competitors at the 1977 Summer Universiade
Competitors at the 1981 Summer Universiade
Competitors at the 1983 Summer Universiade
Place of birth missing (living people)